Metz Township is a township in Vernon County, in the U.S. state of Missouri.

History
The first permanent settlement at Metz Township was made in 1829. Metz Township was erected in 1873, taking its name from the community of Metz, Missouri.

References

Townships in Vernon County, Missouri
Townships in Missouri